Live In Paris: I Just Wanna Rock is the third live album by guitarist Joe Satriani, released in February 2010. It is a 2-CD live set of his live concert in Paris, France, on May 27, 2008.

Track listing
All songs written by Joe Satriani.

Disc 1
"I Just Wanna Rock" - 3:53
"Overdriver" - 5:18
"Satch Boogie" - 4:36
"Ice 9" - 4:38
"Diddle-Y-A-Doo-Dat" - 4:15
"Flying In A Blue Dream" - 5:40
"Ghosts" - 4:52
"Revelation" - 6:31
"Super Colossal" - 4:36
"One Big Rush" - 3:38
"Musterion" - 4:53
"Out Of The Sunrise" - 6:28

Disc 2
"Time Machine" - 8:46
"Cool #9" - 6:06
"Andalusia" 6:49
"Bass Solo" - 6:31
"Cryin'" - 6:42
"The Mystical Potato Head Groove Thing" - 5:53
"Always with Me, Always with You" - 9:01
"Surfing with the Alien" - 6:16
"Crowd Chant" - 3:27
"Summer Song" - 8:05

Charts

References

External links 
 Official Website

Joe Satriani live albums
2010 live albums